Henry Robert Charles Martin (1889 – 1942) was a long-serving officer of arms at the College of Arms in London and a male English international badminton player.

Profile
Born at Maskeliya, Ceylon, the eldest son of Henry Thomas Martin, later of South Kensington, Martin was educated at Bedford School, then at Lincoln College, Oxford. He was called to the bar from the Middle Temple in 1912. He represented England as a badminton player. During the First World War, he served as a captain in the East Lancashire Regiment, and in the Intelligence Department from 1938-41. His first heraldic appointment came on 31 May 1922 when he was made Rouge Croix Pursuivant of Arms in Ordinary to replace Archibald George Blomefield Russell. He held this position until 2 August 1928 when he was promoted to the office of Richmond Herald of Arms in Ordinary to replace Gerald Wollaston. Martin was elected a Fellow of the Society of Antiquaries in 1930. He held this office until his death from heart failure on 23 July 1942.

In 1914, Martin had married Mary Gladys, daughter of the Rev. John Whitby St Quintin, M.A., rector of Hatley St George, Cambridge; they had three daughters: Diana, Pamela (who married, in 1936, John Maitland Cowper, of Barclays Bank), and June.

Badminton career
He was part of the English team that toured Canada in 1925 to promote the sport on behalf of the Canadian Badminton Association which had recently been formed in 1921. He lived in Earls Terrace London at the time.

Arms

See also
Heraldry
Pursuivant
Herald

References

The College of Arms
CUHAGS Officer of Arms Index

1889 births
1942 deaths
English officers of arms
English genealogists
English male non-fiction writers
English male badminton players
20th-century English male writers